Joyce Richards (17 December 1920 – 10 November 2005) was a British sprint canoeist who competed in the late 1940s. She was eliminated in the heats of the K-1 500 m event at the 1948 Summer Olympics in London.

References
Joyce Richards' profile at Sports Reference.com

1920 births
2005 deaths
Canoeists at the 1948 Summer Olympics
Olympic canoeists of Great Britain
British female canoeists